William Butcher was an Oxford college head in the 16th-century.

Butcher was  educated at Lincoln College, Oxford.  He held the living at Duntsbourne Militis. Butcher was President of Corpus Christi College, Oxford, from 1559 until 1561. He died  1 November 1585.

References

1585 deaths
Alumni of Corpus Christi College, Oxford
Presidents of Corpus Christi College, Oxford
16th-century English people